Guillemette de Sarrebruck (circa 1490–1571) was a French court official.  She served as Governess of the Children of France, and Première dame d'honneur to the queen of France, Mary Stuart, from 1559 until 1560.  She had the title comtesse de Braine de jure after 1525, when she inherited the County of Braine from her childless brother.

Life

Guillemette de Sarrebruck was the daughter of Robert II de Sarrebruck-Commercy and Marie d'Amboise. She married Robert III de La Marck in 1510, with whom she had a son, Robert IV de La Marck (1512–1556), Duke of Bouillon, Prince of Sedan and Marshal of France.

Court career

Guillemette de Sarrebruck had a long career at the royal court of France.  She served as dame or dame d'honneur (lady-in-waiting) to three queens of France, Anne de Bretagne, Eleanor of Austria, and Catherine de Médici.  

She served as Governess of the Children of France to the children of Francis I. 

In 1559, she was appointed head lady-in-waiting or Première dame d'honneur to queen Mary Stuart of France.  Her tenure ended after Mary Stuart was widowed in 1560, and returned to Scotland the following year.

References 

 Alain Sartelet, La Principauté de Sedan, Éditions Terres Ardennaises, 1991, 180 p., p. 11.

1490 births
1571 deaths
French ladies-in-waiting
Governesses to the Children of France
Burials at the Abbey of Saint-Yved de Braine
15th-century French people 
15th-century French women 
16th-century French people 
16th-century French women
Court of Mary, Queen of Scots
Court of Francis I of France
Household of Catherine de' Medici